Erasmo Oneglia (1853–1934) was an Italian printer, born in Turin, who was also a successful stamp forger in the 1890s and early 1900s.

Oneglia's first forgeries are believed to have been of the early stamps of Newfoundland and they are included in the second edition of Robert Brisco Earee's Album Weeds in 1892.

In 1897 he was arrested in London for trying to sell forgeries  to the stamp dealers Stanley Gibbons, however, he was let off with a fine of just 20 shillings and his stock confiscated.

Oneglia was closely associated with other Italian forgers of the period such as Angelo Panelli, as well as with the brothers Mariano and Jean de Sperati who worked in Turin for a while and probably with Oneglia.

See also 
List of stamp forgers
Philatelic fakes and forgeries

References

Further reading 

The Oneglia Engraved Forgeries Commonly Attributed to Angelo Panelli, Robson Lowe & Carl Walske, James Bendon, Limassol, Cyprus, 1996. .
Philatelic Forgers: Their Lives and Works, Varro E. Tyler, Robson Lowe, London, 1976.

Italian printers
People from Turin
Stamp forgers
19th-century Italian businesspeople
1853 births
1934 deaths